The Skipton–Ilkley line is the route that the Midland Railway took to link the towns of Skipton and Ilkley via the villages of Embsay, Bolton Abbey and Addingham.

Opening

Closure
The route was closed as the result of the Beeching Axe in 1965 – passenger services were withdrawn on 22 March, whilst the remaining through goods services ended on 5 July; the route eventually closed to all traffic east of Embsay Junction in January 1966 (though access to the Haw Bank quarry sidings at Embsay station survived until 1969).  The last section west of there was retained as part of the freight-only branch line from Skipton to Swinden Quarry (the old Yorkshire Dales Railway) and remains in operation to this day.

Heritage railway 

Since its closure in 1965, a  stretch of the disused railway line has been restored and reopened as the Embsay and Bolton Abbey Steam Railway.

The remainder of the old route beyond Bolton Abbey is disused but mostly intact as far as the outskirts of Addingham, but the former station there has been demolished, levelled and the site redeveloped for housing.

Much of the trackbed east of Addingham itself, as also been redeveloped (or returned to agricultural use), with little trace remaining of the line's course through the western part of Ilkley – as the old embankments, bridges and viaducts were demolished in 1972–73.

West of Embsay, the section of the line down to Skipton is still open, serving the branch line to Swinden Quarry.

References

External links 
Skipton to Ilkley line, pictures in a book
Railways in Ilkley

Closed railway lines in Yorkshire and the Humber
Beeching closures in England 
Rail transport in North Yorkshire
Railway lines opened in 1879